Hu Jieqing (December 23, 1905 - May 21, 2001) was a famed contemporary Chinese painter. She was the wife of the writer Lao She.

Biography
Hu, a native of Beijing, was born as Yuzhen (玉贞). Like her husband, she belonged to the Manchurian minority. Her pen names were Yanyan (燕崖) and Huchun (胡春), and sobriquet, Jieqing (洁青). She graduated from the department of Chinese literature at Beijing Normal University in 1931. She was married with Shu Qingchun (Lao She) in 1931, and accompanied him in the following years and taught literature at some normal schools. She got to know Qi Baishi in 1938, and officially became his student in 1950. She was hired by the Chinese Academy of Painting in Beijing in 1958, as a senior artist. She received numerous awards in her life. In 1980, she held her personal exhibition in Hong Kong, and published her album.

She was a member of the Artists Association of China, and a member of Calligraphers Association of China.

She died at 4:27 pm on May 21, 2001 at Hepingli Hospital, at the age of 96.

Legacy
Hu Jieqing is commemorated together with her husband at the Lao She Memorial Hall, opened in 1999 at 19 Fengfu Lane, close to Wangfujing, in Dongcheng District. Hu Jieqing called the house 'Red Persimmon Courtyard'. It contained persimmon trees planted by her husband.

References

1905 births
2001 deaths
Republic of China painters
Painters from Beijing
Republic of China calligraphers
People's Republic of China calligraphers
Women calligraphers
20th-century Chinese women artists
20th-century Chinese artists